Nakatomi no Iratsume (中臣女郎; dates unknown) was a Japanese noblewoman and waka poet of the Nara period.

Biography 
Nakatomi no Iratsume's birth and death dates are unknown, as is her true given name. (Iratsume means "young woman" or "daughter".)

She was one of the many women around Ōtomo no Yakamochi.

Poetry 
Poems 675, 676, 677, 678, and 679 in the Man'yōshū are attributed to her. These five poems were sōmon-ka sent to Yakamochi.

References

Citations

Works cited 

 
 

8th-century Japanese poets
Man'yō poets
Japanese women poets